MelsecNet is a protocol developed and supported by Mitsubishi Electric for data delivery. MelsecNet supports 239 networks.

MelsecNet protocol has two variants. MELSECNET/H and its predecessor MELSECNET/10 use high speed and redundant functionality to give deterministic delivery of large data volumes. Both variants can use either coaxial bus type or optical loop type for transmission. MELSECNET/H can support a maximum of 19,200 bytes/frame and maximum communication speed of 25 Mbit/s. MELSECNET/10 supports 960 bytes/frame and a baud rate of 10 Mbit/s. Mitsubishi provides a manual for both the variants Melsecnet/H and MelsecNet/10.

Features
 Easy personal computer, HMI and PLC connection
 High-speed data communications with large data volumes
 Reliable and robust data transfers
 Redundancy functions
 10/25 megabaud data transfer rates
 Maximum network distance 30 km, up to 255 segments
 Simple configuration, remote programming
 Floating master

References

External links
 Mitsubishi Europe

Industrial computing
Serial buses
Industrial automation
Mitsubishi Electric products, services and standards